Farmington is a house near Charlottesville, in Albemarle County, Virginia, that was greatly expanded by a design by Thomas Jefferson that Jefferson executed while he was President of the United States. The original house was built in  the mid-18th century for Francis Jerdone on a  property. Jerdone sold the land and house to George Divers, a friend of Jefferson, in 1785. In 1802, Divers asked Jefferson to design an expansion of the house. The house, since greatly enlarged, is now a clubhouse.

Description
The Jefferson addition comprises the present building's main facade, consisting of an elongated octagon with its long axis perpendicular to the large tetrastyle Tuscan portico. The original house was a two-story, three-bay brick house over a basement with a side-hall plan. There were two rooms above and below. Jefferson's addition is to the east. The addition's portico extends for two stories in front of three main bays, with the entry door centered, flanked by typical Jefferson triple-hung windows extending to the floor. The door and windows are crowned by round windows lighting the upper level.  To either side are projecting half-octagon wings with windows matching the central portion. In Jefferson's design and as built, the long octagon was divided into two unequal rooms.  The interior was greatly altered following a mid-19th century fire, with the creation of a central hall and a second floor over all. When the property became a country club the second floor was removed in 1929 and the three spaces were combined into a single space. The house was greatly enlarged to the rear with service, dining and accommodation spaces.

Influence
Farmington was extensively studied by University of Virginia architectural historian Fiske Kimball, who adapted the design for his own residence, Shack Mountain, now a National Historic Landmark.

Farmington was placed on the National Register of Historic Places on September 15, 1970.

References

External links
Farmington, U.S. Route 250 vicinity, Charlottesville vicinity, Albemarle, VA at the Historic American Buildings Survey (HABS)

Houses on the National Register of Historic Places in Virginia
National Register of Historic Places in Albemarle County, Virginia
Houses in Albemarle County, Virginia
Thomas Jefferson buildings
Palladian Revival architecture in Virginia
Historic American Buildings Survey in Virginia